Hong Kong Institute of Languages (HKIL) is a privately owned language school established in 1985 by a French couple, Dominique and Christian Cohasset.

History 
The institute originally started as a French language school in Hong Kong, specifically teaching French to small groups of executives. By the 1990s, the founders Dominique and Christian Cohasset expanded their business by providing six other language offerings (including, English, Spanish, German, Cantonese, and Japanese), and as well as providing these language classes for children and very young children (from two years of age and upwards).

Concept 

 Hong Kong Institute of Languages concept was, and still is, to teach only small-group classes. Emphasis is on interaction and oral practice of the language in the class. The focus is on practical language that can be used right away. "[1]
 In the 1990s, HK KIDZ was established as an extension of HKIL, specifically tailored for young children (ages 1.5–12).[2]
 The HK KIDZ concept has the same foundation as HKIL. For teaching children, however, it emphasizes more on "fun... acquisition of the language being achieved through hands-on activities: games, songs, etc., in the same way, that they acquired their mother language."[1]

Summer Camps & Language Study Programmes 
HKIL was "the first language school to organize overseas summer camps" in Hong Kong.[1]

In 1992, HKIL organized its first overseas summer camp trip to Paris, France, for children and teenagers. By 2008, HKIL extended its summer camp trips/language study programs to countries including England, Canada, France, Switzerland, China, and Spain.[2]

Awards 
One of the founders of HKIL, Christian Chasset, was awarded the "Chevalier dans l'Ordre des Palmes Academiques" (Knight in the Order of the Academic Palms), the French Government's highest honor for academic achievement, for advancing the cause of French culture, education, and the fine arts"[1] on May 28, 2007.

The co-founder of HKIL, Dominique Chasset, was awarded the Ordre National du Mérite ("Knight of the National Order of Merit").[2]

References 

Mrs. Dominique Chasset received the decoration of Knight of l’Ordre National du Mérite by the Consul General of France in Hong Kong and Macao. "News: Consulate General of France in Hong Kong & Macau"

Revolutionizing Language Instruction. "Article: Hong Kong General Chamber of Commerce"
New Language for New Lands. "Article: British Chamber of Commerce in Hong Kong|Britain in Hong Kong Magazine (Issue 38 Sept - Oct 2015). p.51."
French Language in Hong Kong. "Article: Consulate General of France in Hong Kong & Macau"
30 ans déjà !  "Article: Trait d’Union (November 3, 2015)"
Hong Kong Institute of Languages taps into city’s booming foreign language learning trend. "Article: French Chamber Hong Kong (December 11, 2015)"
Spreading French in Hong Kong for Over Three Decades. "Article: Hong Kong General Chamber of Commerce (Bulletin, December 2016)"

External links 
 Hong Kong Institute of Languages Official Website
 HK Kidz Education Centre Official Website, a branch of HKIL

Language schools
Academic language institutions